The Vintage Virgin is the second studio album from Swedish Pop/Rock and alternative rock singer Sebastian Karlsson, led by the singles "Words and Violence" (#3) and the Melodifestivalen 2007 entry "When the Night Comes Falling" (#2) the album was released on March 7, 2007 one year and one week after his previous and first album "Sebastian", and this time it debuted at number 2.

Track listing
 "Troubled Skies" – 3:44
 "When the Night Comes Falling" – 3:14
 "Charlie Calm Down" – 3:18
 "I Can Feel You" – 3:46
 "Lead Me There" – 3:29
 "Words and Violence" – 3:40
 "Falling in Love With You Again" – 4:05
 "Kiss Kiss Kiss" – 3:29
 "Bear With Me" – 3:40
 "Trigger" – 3:44
 "Drink this Bottle of Wine" – 4:24

 All songs written by Sebastian Karlsson and Peter Kvint

Chart performance

Singles
 2006 – "Words and Violence" No. 3
 2007 – "When the Night Comes Falling" No. 2

References
 

2007 albums
Sebastian Karlsson (singer) albums
Sony BMG albums